Strathocles is a genus of moths of the family Noctuidae.

Taxonomy
Strathocles was circumscribed by Herbert Druce in Biologia Centrali-Americana. He initially included two species, both described in the same work: S. ribbei, which Druce designated as the genus's type species, and S. imitata.

Species
, GBIF recognizes the following species:

References

Herminiinae